In set theory and mathematical logic, the Lévy hierarchy, introduced by Azriel Lévy in 1965, is a hierarchy of formulas in the formal language of the Zermelo–Fraenkel set theory, which is typically called just the language of set theory. This is analogous to the arithmetical hierarchy, which provides a similar classification for sentences of the language of arithmetic.

Definitions

In the language of set theory, atomic formulas are of the form x = y or x ∈ y, standing for equality and set membership predicates, respectively.

The next levels are given by finding an equivalent formula in prenex normal form, and counting the number of changes of quantifiers:

In the theory ZFC, a formula  is called:

As a formula might have several different equivalent formulas in prenex normal form, it might belong to several different levels of the hierarchy. In this case, the lowest possible level is the level of the formula.

Examples

Σ0=Π0=Δ0 formulas and concepts
x = {y, z}
x ⊆ y.
x is a transitive set.
x is an ordinal, x is a limit ordinal, x is a successor ordinal
x is a finite ordinal
The first countable ordinal ω.
f is a function. x is the range or domain of the function f. y is the value of f on x. 
The Cartesian product of two sets.
x is the union of y.
x is a member of the αth level of Godel's L.

Δ1-formulas and concepts

 x is a well-founded relation on y. 
 x is finite
Ordinal addition and multiplication and exponentiation 
The rank (with respect to Gödel's constructible universe) of a set
The transitive closure of a set

Σ1-formulas and concepts

 x is countable
|X|≤|Y|, |X|=|Y|
x is constructible

Π1-formulas and concepts

 x is a cardinal
 x is a regular cardinal
 x is a limit cardinal
 x is an inaccessible cardinal.
 x is the powerset of y

Δ2-formulas and concepts

κ is γ-supercompact

Σ2-formulas and concepts

 the continuum hypothesis 
 there exists an inaccessible cardinal
 there exists a measurable cardinal
 κ is an n-huge cardinal

Π2-formulas and concepts

 The axiom of constructibility: V = L

Δ3-formulas and concepts

Σ3-formulas and concepts

 there exists a supercompact cardinal

Π3-formulas and concepts

 κ is an extendible cardinal

Σ4-formulas and concepts

 there exists an extendible cardinal

Properties 
Jech p. 184
Devlin p. 29

See also 
 Arithmetic hierarchy
 Absoluteness

References

 
 
 
 

Mathematical logic
Set theory
Mathematical logic hierarchies